Couchy Creek Nature Reserve is a protected nature reserve located in the Northern Rivers region of New South Wales, Australia.

Established in 1999, Couchy Creek Nature Reserve is part of an important vegetation corridor and contains
wet sclerophyll eucalyptus forest and endangered lowland rainforest. Ten threatened species have been recorded, including the Crystal Creek Walnut and Davidsons Plum.

See also

 Protected areas of New South Wales

References 

Northern Rivers
Forests of New South Wales
Nature reserves in New South Wales
1999 establishments in Australia
Protected areas established in 1999